Grevillea pungens, also known as flame grevillea, is a species of flowering plant in the family Proteaceae and is endemic to the Northern Territory in Australia. It is a shrub with egg-shaped leaves with rigid, sharply-pointed teeth or lobes, and hairy, deep pink to orange flowers.

Description
The lower lobes are usually toothed or divided again. Flowering mainly occurs in the dry season from July to November.

Taxonomy
Grevillea pungens was first formally described in 1810 by Robert Brown in the Transactions of the Linnean Society of London. The specific epithet (pungens) means "sharply pointed".

Distribution and habitat
Flame grevillea occurs in the tropical Top End of the Northern Territory, from Gunbalanya to Gove and the lower Roper River. It grows in open eucalypt woodland on sandy soils, often among rocks or near creeks.

References

pungens
Proteales of Australia
Endemic flora of Australia
Flora of the Northern Territory
Taxa named by Robert Brown (botanist, born 1773)
Plants described in 1810